Nobukhosi Ncube (born 17 February 1993) is a Zimbabwean footballer who plays as a defender. She has been a member of the Zimbabwe women's national team.

International career
Ncube capped for Zimbabwe at senior level during the 2016 Africa Women Cup of Nations.

References

1993 births
Living people
Zimbabwean women's footballers
Zimbabwe women's international footballers
Women's association football defenders